Dark Fire is the sixth book in the paranormal/romance series Dark Series by American author Christine Feehan. It is the second book in a trilogy written within the Dark Series, and it starts several months after the events in Dark Challenge.

Synopsis
When Darius, the leader of a group of Carpathian musicians, first sees the new mechanic hired to work on the band's touring vehicles, he is astonished to see the red color of her hair. It has been centuries since he last saw colors or even felt emotions.

Although the mechanic Tempest Trine needs the job, she quickly realizes that in touring with Darius, she's bitten off more than she can chew. Tempest has always felt different, apart from others. But from the moment his arms close around her, enveloping her in a sorcerer's spell, Darius seems to understand her unique gifts. But does his kiss offer the love and belonging she seeks, or a danger more potent than anything she has ever known?

Plot
The result of the advertisement posted after Dark Challenge appeared in person as the new mechanic, Tempest Trine. Darius takes a while to realize that she is his true lifemate, a concept newly introduced to him by Julian Savage, his sister Desari's new lifemate. Julian is also the first person to note the fact, and is certain that a good show is coming for the family unit to watch.

However, Tempest has no intention of staying with Darius, whom she thinks is a vampire. After being persuaded that they are not, in fact, vampires, "Rusti" Tempest Trine proves a loyal ally.

She is another (the fourth) female human to undergo conversion to a Carpathian, after Darius completes the transfusion.

Awards
2001 PEARL AWARDS
ParaNormal Excellence Awards in Romantic Literature
Best Shapeshifter
Best Overall Paranormal

2001 Romantic Times Reviewers' Choice Awards 
Won - Best Vampire Romance
Nominee - Mainstream Novels

2001 RIO Dorothy Parker Awards 
3rd Place - Paranormal Romances

2001 Reader's Choice Awards from Love Romances 
Honorable Mention - Best Paranormal Romance
Honorable Mention - Best Vampire Romance

2001 RBL Romantica Hughie Awards 
Won - Best Cover

See also

Dark Prince
Dark Desire
Dark Gold
Dark Magic
Carpathians

2001 American novels
Novels by Christine Feehan
American vampire novels
Paranormal romance novels
American romance novels